The Central Hindi Directorate, New Delhi is the directorate, under the Ministry of Education (India), responsible for promotion of Standard Hindi. It also regulates the use of Devanagari script and Hindi spelling in India. In keeping with the instructions of Article 351 of the Constitution of India, the Central Hindi Directorate of 1 March 1960 was established. There are four regional offices situated at Chennai, Hyderabad, Guwahati and Kolkata.

See also
Grammar of Modern Standard Hindi
Vemuri Anjaneya Sarma

References

External links
 

1955 establishments in India
Hindi
Hindi
Ministry of Education (India)
Organisations based in Delhi
Language advocacy organizations
Government agencies established in 1955